Greatest Hits is a compilation album by the contemporary Christian music singer Steven Curtis Chapman released on October 21, 1997, by Sparrow Records. The album was repackaged in 2008.

Track listing

Personnel 
 Steven Curtis Chapman – lead vocals, backing vocals (1), guitars (1, 8, 13, 14)
 Scott Sheriff – Hammond B3 organ (1, 13, 14), backing vocals (1, 13, 14)
 Hardy Hemphill – acoustic piano (1, 13, 14), harmonica (14)
 Shane Keister – keyboards (8)
 Phil Madeira – Hammond B3 organ (8)
 Kenny Greenberg – guitars (1, 8)
 Randy Pearce – guitars (1, 13, 14), backing vocals (13, 14)
 Gordon Kennedy – guitars (8)
 Brent Barcus – guitars (13, 14)
 Adam Anders – bass (1, 8, 13, 14), backing vocals (13, 14)
 Leland Sklar – bass (8)
 Will Denton – drums (1, 8, 13, 14)
 Chris McHugh – drums (8)
 Chris Rodriguez – backing vocals (8)

Production 
 Dan Raines – executive producer
 Peter York – executive producer
 Brown Bannister – producer (1, 8, 13, 14)
 Steven Curtis Chapman – producer (1, 8, 9, 13, 14)
 Phil Naish – producer (2-7, 9-12)
 Steve Bishir – recording (1, 8, 13, 14), mixing (1, 8, 13, 14)
 Hank Nirider – assistant engineer (1, 8)
 Andrew Dudman – assistant engineer (13, 14)
 The Dugout (Nashville, Tennessee) – recording location (1, 8)
 Abbey Road Studios (London, England) – recording location (13, 14)
 Seventeen Grand Studio (Nashville, Tennessee) – mixing location (1, 8, 13, 14)
 Steve Hall – mastering
 Future Disc (Hollywood, California) – mastering location
 Traci Sterling – production manager
 Jan Cook – art direction
 Joyce Revoir – art direction
 Kerosene Halo – design
 Christiév Carothers – creative director
 Robert Fleischauer – cover photography, inside photos
 Marc Hanauer – inside photos
 Olivia Rutherford – London photos
 Gino Tanabe – stylist
 Johnny Villanueva – grooming

References 

Steven Curtis Chapman albums
1997 greatest hits albums